Quick Curtain is a 1934 detective novel by the British writer Alan Melville. It was his second novel following his breakout success with the country house mystery Weekend at Thrackley earlier the same year. It was reissued in 2015 by the British Library Publishing as part of a group of crime novels from the Golden Age of Detective Fiction.

Synopsis
When  leading man Brandon Baker is shot dead mid-performance at the Grosvenor Theatre Inspector Wilson and his eager journalist son take up the investigation.

References

Bibliography
 Hopkins, Lisa. Shakespearean Allusion in Crime Fiction: DCI Shakespeare. Springer, 2016.
 Hubin, Allen J. Crime Fiction, 1749-1980: A Comprehensive Bibliography. Garland Publishing, 1984.
 Wolfe, Graham. Theatre-Fiction in Britain from Henry James to Doris Lessing: Writing in the Wings. Routledge, 2019.

1934 British novels
British mystery novels
Novels by Alan Melville
Novels set in London
British detective novels